Paitzdorf is a German municipality in the Thuringian Landkreis of Greiz.  It belongs to the Verwaltungsgemeinschaft of Wünschendorf/Elster.

Geography

Neighboring municipalities
Communities near Paitzdorf are the City of Ronneburg and Rückersdorf in the Landkreis of Greiz; as well as Heukewalde and Posterstein in the Landkreis of Altenburger Land.

Municipal arrangement
Mennsdorf is Paitzdorf's only district.

History
Paitzdorf was first mentioned in writing in 1290.

In 1837, around 140 Paitzdorfers left for America, seeking religious freedom.  Along with immigrants from Saxony, they founded the communities of Altenburg, Frohna, Wittenberg, Dresden, and Paitzdorf on the Mississippi river in Missouri.  This group would later found the Lutheran Church–Missouri Synod.

In 1963, Paitzdorf's windmill, erected in 1792, was torn down.

References

Greiz (district)